The team eventing in equestrian at the 1932 Summer Olympics in Los Angeles was held at the Riviera Country Club (dressage), a specially built course in Westchester (cross-country), and the Olympic Stadium (jumping) from 10 to 13 August. NOCs were limited to three horse and rider pairs.

Of the four teams that entered the competition, two had all three members finish. No bronze medal was awarded.

Competition format

The team and individual eventing competitions used the same scores. Eventing consisted of a dressage test, a cross-country test, and a jumping test. The total individual maximum score was 2000 points, with 400 available in dressage, 1300 in cross-country, and 300 in jumping. In the dressage portion, three juries gave scores out of 400; the average of the three was the score for the segment. In the cross-country section, penalties were issued for faults and for going over the time limit (with small bonuses available for finishing early); the total penalties minus bonuses were subtracted from 1300 to give the score for the round. Penalties were also given for faults and slow performances in jumping, with the total penalties subtracted from 300 for that round. The three segment scores were summed to give a final score.

The scores of the three team members were added to give a team score. All three members of the team had to finish the competition to receive a team score.

Schedule

Results

Standings after dressage

Standings after cross-country

Final standings 

Final results below, determined by combining the three overall scores for each team.

References

Team eventing